The Citizens' Club Tyrol is an Austrian political party active in Tyrol. It was founded by Fritz Gurgiser, formerly co-leader of the Citizens' Forum Tyrol, in 2009. In the 2013 state election the party won 4.8% of the vote and failed to elect any members of the local Landtag.

References

External links
 Official website

Political parties in Austria
Political parties established in 2009